There are several rivers named Canoas River in Brazil:

 Canoas River (São Paulo)
 Canoas River (Paraná)
 Canoas River (Mampituba River tributary)
 Canoas River (Santa Catarina)

See also
 Río Cañas (disambiguation)
 Cañas River (disambiguation)